Peter Brockman may refer to:

Peter M. Brockman, member of the Oregon State Senate
Peter Brockman, character in The Christmas Choir
Pete Brockman, fictional character in Outnumbered